The QLS (Quick Lock Standard) is a quick locking replacement for the threaded interface of the popular SMA connector. Designed and manufactured jointly by German-based RF and Microwave component suppliers Telegartner and IMS Connector Systems, this new connector emerged in 2006 as an answer to some of the shortcomings of the original QMA: Improvements in this version include: A strong locking mechanism that makes it very difficult to accidentally detach the connector and a longer life-span.

External links
 http://www.telegaertner.com/en/info/highlights/quick-lock-standard/
 http://www.imscs.com/index.php/products/quick-lock-connectors/?lang=en 
 http://www.imscs.com/wp-content/uploads/Katalog_qls.pdf

See also
 SMA connector

References

RF connectors